Sokolov (masculine) or Sokolova (feminine)  may refer to:

Sokolov (surname) (or Sokolova).

Places
Sokolov District, a district in the Karlovy Vary Region of the Czech Republic
Sokolov, Czech Republic, a town in the Karlovy Vary Region of the Czech Republic; capital of Sokolov District
Sokolov, Russia (or Sokolova), several rural localities in Russia

See also
Sokolow, a variant spelling of the last name
Sokoloff, surname
Sokolić, surname
Sokolović, surname
Sokolovo (disambiguation)
Sokolovac (disambiguation)
Sokolovići (disambiguation)
Sokołów (disambiguation)